Dendropsophus sanborni is a species of frog in the family Hylidae.
It is found in Argentina, Brazil, Paraguay, and Uruguay.
Its natural habitats are moist savanna, subtropical or tropical dry lowland grassland, subtropical or tropical seasonally wet or flooded lowland grassland, freshwater marshes, intermittent freshwater marshes, plantations, ponds, canals, and ditches.

References

sanborni
Amphibians described in 1944
Taxonomy articles created by Polbot